The women's 4 × 100 metre medley relay event at the 2016 Summer Olympics took place on 12–13 August at the Olympic Aquatics Stadium in Rio de Janeiro. By winning gold, the U.S. women brought home America's 1000th gold medal in the nation's Summer Olympics history.

Summary
The U.S. women's team outlasted the rest of the field to solidify its Olympic title defense in the medley relay final with the help of a freestyle anchor leg from Simone Manuel. Leading from the start, the foursome of Kathleen Baker (59.00), Lilly King (1:05.70), Dana Vollmer (56.00), and Manuel (52.43) put together a perfect ending with a final time of 3:53.13 to give the Americans their tenth gold medal in this event, and their thousandth overall in Summer Olympic history.

Australia's Emily Seebohm (58.83), Taylor McKeown (1:07.05), and Emma McKeon (56.95) struggled to hold on their momentum throughout the race, until Cate Campbell jumped into the pool at the final exchange. Then, Campbell produced a freestyle anchor split of 52.17 to deliver the Australian relay team a silver medal in 3:55.00. After winning the 50 m freestyle title an hour earlier, anchor Pernille Blume (53.21) helped her fellow Danish swimmers Mie Nielsen (58.75), Rikke Møller Pedersen (1:06.62), and Jeanette Ottesen (56.43) shatter the European record for the bronze in 3:55.01, a hundredth of a second behind Australia.

China's Fu Yuanhui (59.53), Shi Jinglin (1:06.00), Lu Ying (56.49), and Zhu Menghui (53.16) slipped off the podium to fourth in 3:55.18, while the Canadian combination of Kylie Masse (58.77), Rachel Nicol (1:06.81), Penny Oleksiak (56.75), and Chantal van Landeghem (53.16) established a national record of 3:55.49 to take the fifth spot. Russia's Anastasia Fesikova (59.49), Yuliya Yefimova (1:04.98), Svetlana Chimrova (57.54), and Veronika Popova (53.65) finished sixth with a 3:55.66, holding off the British quartet of Georgia Davies (59.43), Chloe Tutton (1:06.43), Siobhan-Marie O’Connor (57.47), and Francesca Halsall (53.63) by 1.3 seconds, a seventh-place time in 3:56.96. Meanwhile, Italy (3:59.50), anchored by freestyle swimmer and four-time Olympian Federica Pellegrini, rounded out the championship field.

Records
Prior to this competition, the existing world and Olympic records were as follows.

Competition format

The competition consisted of two rounds: heats and a final. The relay teams with the best 8 times in the heats advanced to the final. Swim-offs were used as necessary to break ties for advancement to the next round.

Results

Heats
A total of sixteen countries have qualified to participate. The best eight from two heats advanced to the final.

Final

References

Women's 4 x 100 metre medley relay
4 × 100 metre medley relay
2016 in women's swimming
Women's events at the 2016 Summer Olympics